Air Vice-Marshal Cameron Archer Turner,  (29 August 1915 – 26 November 1999) was a senior Royal New Zealand Air Force (RNZAF) officer, who served as Chief of Air Staff from 1966 to 1969.

Turner joined the Royal Air Force in 1936, before being commissioned in the RNZAF in 1940 and serving in the Second World War. He would go on to command four RNZAF stations, to hold a number of staff appointments, and was Air Member for Supply before being appointed head of the RNZAF. In retirement, he was director of the New Zealand Inventions Development Authority (1969–1976) and president of the Royal New Zealand Air Force Association (1972–1981).

Turner was appointed Commander of the Order of the British Empire (CBE) the 1960 New Year Honours, and Companion of the Order of the Bath (CB) in the 1968 New Year Honours.

References

 

|-

External links
 

1915 births
1999 deaths
Royal New Zealand Air Force air marshals
Commanders of the Order of the British Empire
Companions of the Order of the Bath
Royal Air Force officers